Ace vs. Ace Season 5 is a large scale indoor sports TV show produced by Zhejiang Satellite TV Program Center, hosted by Shen Tao. In each episode several well-known guests such as singers, actress, and TV hosts are invited to participate in games and advertise their own products.  Each episode has a different theme such as love, the '90s, or career, reflected in the games played by contestants. (After 3 rounds of games, the guests share experiences and memories from their career. The "Ace Family", composed of Shen Teng, Guanxiao Tong, Hua Chenyu, and Jia Ling, appear in every episode and compete with other guests. The show is broadcast on Zhejiang Satellite TV at 21:20 every Friday since February 21, 2020.

Ace Family (Frequent Guests) 

 Shen Teng, comedian actor, active since 2003
 Guanxiao Tong, actress, active since 2001
 Hua Chenyu, singer, active since 2013
 Jia Ling, comedian actress, active since 2003

Episodes

References 
YouTube ZheJiang STV Official Channel "Ace vs. Ace"

"Ace vs. Ace Official" Weibo Site

Zhejiang Satellite TV

2020 Chinese television seasons